Sinatra at the Sands is a live album by Frank Sinatra accompanied by Count Basie and his orchestra, and conducted and arranged by Quincy Jones, recorded live in the Copa Room of the former Sands Hotel and Casino in Las Vegas in 1966.

It was Sinatra's first live album to be commercially released, and contains many definitive readings of the songs that are most readily associated with Sinatra.

Sinatra and Basie had previously collaborated on 1962's Sinatra-Basie and 1964's It Might As Well Be Swing, with both albums released on Sinatra's Reprise label. The album was remixed and remastered and released in DVD-Audio in high-resolution stereo and multi-channel surround in 2003. An alternate version of the same show with a slightly different track list was released in November 2006 as part of the box set Sinatra: Vegas. The album is certified gold by the Recording Industry Association of America.

In 2000 it was voted number 461 in Colin Larkin's All Time Top 1000 Albums.

Tea Break
"The Tea Break" section of the album contains comic relief by Sinatra, during which he makes jokes about the drunkenness of Dean Martin and evening parties at his home in Beverly Hills, Sammy Davis Jr.'s autobiography Yes I Can and the hotel hiring him for "four solid weeks" as a cleaner, and jokes about himself being "so skinny my eyes were single file. Between those two and my belly button my old man thought I was a clarinet". He denounces the news that he'd recently turned fifty years of age as a "dirty Communist lie" "direct from Hanoi" and that he was really 28 and would have been 22 if Joe E. Lewis hadn't "wrecked" him from drinking. He concludes the segment with a summation of his early life and work lifting crates and serving as a rivet catcher from a cock-eyed guy who "couldn't hit a bull in a fanny with a bag of rice", and describing Edward Bowes as a "pompous bum with a bulbous nose" who "used to drink Green River".

Track listing
From the 1998 Warner Bros. Records reissue, 46947

 "Come Fly with Me" (Sammy Cahn, Jimmy Van Heusen) – 3:45
 "I've Got a Crush on You" (George Gershwin, Ira Gershwin) – 2:42
 "I've Got You Under My Skin" (Cole Porter) – 3:43
 "The Shadow of Your Smile" (Johnny Mandel, Paul Francis Webster) – 2:31
 "Street of Dreams" (Victor Young, Sam M. Lewis) – 2:16
 "One for My Baby (and One More for the Road)" (Harold Arlen, Johnny Mercer) – 4:40
 "Fly Me to the Moon" (Bart Howard) – 2:50
 "One O'Clock Jump" [Instrumental] (Count Basie) – 0:53
 "The Tea Break" (Sinatra Monologue) – 11:48
 "You Make Me Feel So Young" (Mack Gordon, Josef Myrow) – 3:21
 "All of Me" [Instrumental] (Gerald Marks, Seymour Simons) – 2:56
 "The September of My Years" (Cahn, Van Heusen) – 2:57
 "Luck Be a Lady" (Frank Loesser) – 4:40 (This bonus track was only available on the remastered 1998 CD and 2003 DVD-Audio releases. It was not part of any other edition, including the original LP as well as the current [2010] in-print CD)
 "Get Me to the Church on Time" (Frederick Loewe, Alan Jay Lerner) – 2:22
 "It Was a Very Good Year" (Ervin Drake) – 4:01
 "Don't Worry 'Bout Me" (Rube Bloom, Ted Koehler) – 3:18
 "Makin' Whoopee" [Instrumental] (Walter Donaldson, Gus Kahn) – 4:24
 "Where or When" (Richard Rodgers, Lorenz Hart) – 2:46
 "Angel Eyes" (Earl Brent, Matt Dennis) – 3:26
 "My Kind of Town" (Cahn, Van Heusen) – 3:04
 "A Few Last Words" (Sinatra Monologue) – 2:30
 "My Kind of Town" [Reprise] – 1:00

Certifications

Personnel 
 Frank Sinatra – vocal
 Count Basie – piano
 Bill Miller - piano
 The Count Basie Orchestra
 Quincy Jones – arranging, conducting
 Harry "Sweets" Edison – trumpet solo
 Al Aarons - trumpet
 Sonny Cohn - trumpet
 Wallace Davenport - trumpet
 Phil Guilbeau - trumpet
 Al Grey – trombone
 Henderson Chambers - trombone
 Grover Mitchell - trombone
 Bill Hughes - trombone
 Marshal Royal – alto saxophone / clarinet
 Bobby Plater - alto saxophone / flute
 Eric Dixon – tenor saxophone / flute
 Eddie "Lockjaw" Davis - tenor saxophone
 Charlie Fowlkes – baritone saxophone / bass clarinet
 Freddie Green – guitar
 Norman Keenan – Double bass
 Irv Cottler - drums
 Sonny Payne – drums

See also
Sinatra: Vegas (2006) – features an alternate performance.
Standing Room Only (2018) – features an alternate performance.

"Count Basie Live at the Sands (before Frank)" – Reprise Records CD, 1998. – Collection of Count Basie Orchestra instrumentals recorded during the taping of "Sinatra at the Sands".

References

Frank Sinatra live albums
Count Basie Orchestra live albums
Albums produced by Sonny Burke
Albums arranged by Quincy Jones
1966 live albums
Reprise Records live albums
Albums recorded at the Sands Hotel
Albums conducted by Quincy Jones
Collaborative albums